"Fare Thee Well Love" is a song recorded by Canadian music group The Rankin Family. It was released in 1992 as the second single from their second studio album, Fare Thee Well Love. It peaked in the top 10 on the RPM Country Tracks and Adult Contemporary Tracks charts, and won the Juno Award for Single of the Year at the Juno Awards of 1994.

Chart performance

Year-end charts

References

1990 songs
1992 singles
The Rankin Family songs
Capitol Records singles
Songs written by Jimmy Rankin
Juno Award for Single of the Year singles